Earlton (Timiskaming Regional) Airport  is located  southwest of Earlton, Ontario. The airport has a  paved runway oriented east–west, and a  gravel/snow runway oriented north–south.

References

External links

Certified airports in Timiskaming District